The Minister of the Interior is a senior member of the Constitutional Government of East Timor heading the Ministry of the Interior.

Functions
Under the Constitution of East Timor, the Minister has the power and the duty:

Where the Minister is in charge of the subject matter of a government statute, the Minister is also required, together with the Prime Minister, to sign the statute.

Incumbent
The incumbent Minister of the Interior is Taur Matan Ruak, Prime Minister of East Timor. He is assisted by António Armindo, Deputy Minister of the Interior, and Joaquim José Gusmão dos Reis Martins, Secretary of State for Civil Protection.

List of Ministers 
The following individuals have been appointed as the Minister:

References

Footnote

Notes

External links

  – official site

 
Interior